Jhalak Dikhhla Jaa 7 is the seventh season of the dance reality show, Jhalak Dikhhla Jaa. It premiered on 7 June 2014 on Colors. The series was hosted by Ranvir Shorey and Drashti Dhami but later got replaced by Manish Paul. Madhuri Dixit, Karan Johar and Remo D'Souza were the three judges. The finale took place on 20 September 2014 and was won by Ashish Sharma and Shampa Gopikrishna.

Contestants

Score chart

 In week 12, Sophie did not get any scores as she was in the face-off round before she got eliminated
 In week 10, Kiku did not get any scores as she was in the face-off round before she got eliminated
 Due to the health condition and Shakti being hospitalized, the duo Shakti and Tushar were unable to perform in week 13. Hence, no marks were given to them that week.

green numbers indicates the highest score.
red numbers indicates the lowest score.
 indicates the winning couple.
 indicates the runner-up couple.
 indicates the second runner-up couple
 indicates the fourth-place couple
 indicates the couple eliminated that week.
 indicates the returning couple that finished in the bottom three.
n/a indicates the couple did not get any scores

Guests

Themes 
The celebrities and professional partners danced one of these routines for each corresponding week:
 Grand Opening Week: Introduction
 Week 1 : International Judge Week
 Week 2 : Made in India
 Week 3 : Judges Demand 
 Week 4 : Jhalak Talkes
 Week 5 : Wild Card Entries & Prop Week
 Week 6 : I Love
 Week 7 : DJ Mix & Indian Cinema
 Week 8 : Kurukshetra & Team Challenge
 Week 9 : Backstage Dancer week 
 Week 10 : Independence Day week
 Week 11 : Dialogues
 Week 12 : Teen Ka Tadka & Public’s Demand
 Week 13 : Special Group Theme
 Week 14 : Semi Finals & Ganesh Hegde Special 
 Week 15 : Super Finale

Week 5 was themed 'Prop week', and each of the participating celebrities dedicated their performances as follow.

 Puja & Rajit - Picture frame
 Ashish & Shampa - Stretchy Jacket 
 Karan & Elena - Bucket
 Mouni & Punit - Golden Shoes
 Kiku & Kruti - Glass
 Akshat & Vaishanavi - Glasses
 Shakti & Tushar - Stretchy Material
 Sophie & Deepak - Sticks
 Malishka & Diwakar - Square Box
 Kushal & Mohena - Heart 
 Tara & Jack - Feather

1st Episode of Week 5 themed 'Wild Card' Special selected 4 new contestant to current participating celebrities.
Note - Singer Akriti Kakkar had to quit the show as she was to enter the wild card race due to an accident.

Out of the 5 new Wild Card Entrance the couples which joined the current celebrities in the race of 'Jhalak' were
 Malishka & Diwakar
 Kushal & Mohena
 Tara & Jack
 Selected Dance
 Rejected Dance

Week 8 themed 'Kurukshetra is where the judges chooses their teams within the participants and the one with more scores wins.

Weak 10 themed 'Team Challenge' had two performances from the participants, where one was a team performance. Team leader was selected from the previous week's highest scorers. Team participants, dancing style and songs were finalised by these leaders.

 Mouni's team won the team challenge with getting 30 marks.
Green numbers indicates the highest score.

Week 13 was themed 'Teen Ka Tadka' special episode wherein every contestant will get a new celebrity contestant to dance with. Sana and Tushar who were paired with Mumaith Khan could not perform in the episode since they got eliminated in that week.
 Ashish & Shampa with Sana Saeed 
 Shakti & Tushar with Mukti Mohan
 Karan & Bhavna with Krystle D'Souza 
 Mouni & Punit with Faisal Khan
 Sophie & Deepak with Elli Avram 
 Akshat & Vaishnavi with Ali Asgar

References

External links 
 Jhalak Dikhhla Jaa 7 at Colors TV

Dance competition television shows
Indian dance television shows
Jhalak Dikhhla Jaa seasons
Colors TV original programming